Laura Gowing is professor of early modern history at King's College London. She received her PhD from Royal Holloway, London.

Research
Gowing's research relates to early modern England, women, gender, the body, sexuality, crime, disorder, and London. In Common Bodies (2003), Gowing critiqued the approaches of Thomas W. Laqueur and Michel Foucault to the history of the body in the early modern period in a book that was positively reviewed in The Guardian.

Selected publications
Ingenious Trade, Cambridge University Press, 2021.
"The manner of submission: gender and demeanour in 17th century London", Cultural and Social History 10:1 (2013).
Gender Relations in Early Modern England, (Pearson Longman, 2012)
"Women’s bodies and the making of sex in seventeenth-century England", Signs: Journal of Women in Culture and Society 37: 4 (2012),  pp. 813–822. ISSN 0097-9740.
"The politics of women's friendship in early modern England", in Gowing, Hunter and Rubin (eds), 2005, Love, Friendship and Faith in Europe 1300-1800, pp. 131–149 [Chapter].
Common bodies : women, touch and power in seventeenth-century England. New Haven, Conn.; London: Yale University Press, 2003.
Domestic Dangers: Women, Words, and Sex in Early Modern London. Oxford: Oxford University Press, 1996.

References

External links 
Laura Gowing at academia.edu
My favourite historical places: Professor Laura Gowing.

Year of birth missing (living people)
Living people
Academics of King's College London
Alumni of Royal Holloway, University of London
British historians
British women historians